Neftekumsk is a town and the administrative center of Neftekumsky District in Stavropol Krai, Russia, located on the right bank of the Kuma River,  east of Stavropol, the administrative center of the krai. Population:

History
It was founded in 1961 as an oil-extracting settlement. It was granted urban-type settlement status in 1962 and town status in 1968.

Administrative and municipal status
Within the framework of administrative divisions, Neftekumsk serves as the administrative center of Neftekumsky District. As an administrative division, it is incorporated within Neftekumsky District as the Town of Neftekumsk. As a municipal division, the Town of Neftekumsk is incorporated within Neftekumsky Municipal District as Neftekumsk Urban Settlement.

Climate

References

Notes

Sources

External links
 Official website of Neftekumsk
 Unofficial website of Neftekumsk

Cities and towns in Stavropol Krai
Cities and towns built in the Soviet Union
Populated places established in 1961